Khalif Malik Ibn Shaman Brown (born June 7, 1993), known professionally as Swae Lee, is an American singer, songwriter and rapper. Known for his wide vocal range and genre-bending, Lee is one half of the hip hop duo Rae Sremmurd with his brother Slim Jxmmi. As a member of Rae Sremmurd, he achieved success with the singles "No Flex Zone", "No Type", and "Black Beatles", the last of which topped the Billboard Hot 100 chart. In 2017, he was featured French Montana's single "Unforgettable", which earned him his first top ten on the Billboard Hot 100 as a soloist, and was later certified Diamond (10× Platinum) by the Recording Industry Association of America (RIAA).

He was also nominated for a Grammy Award for Song of the Year in 2017 for co-writing Beyoncé's single "Formation". In 2018, Lee released his debut solo studio album Swaecation as part of Rae Sremmurd's third album, SR3MM (2018), which was a triple album. In the same year, his song "Sunflower" with Post Malone was the lead single to the soundtrack for the film Spider-Man: Into the Spider-Verse (2018). The song peaked atop the Billboard Hot 100, was nominated for two Grammy Awards, and reached Diamond status, being certified 17× Platinum by the RIAA. He was also featured on the single "Close to Me" by Ellie Goulding and Diplo, which reached number one on the US Adult Top 40 airplay chart. In 2020, he released the single "Be Like That" with Kane Brown and Khalid, which reached the top 20 on the Billboard Hot 100.

Early life 
Khalif Malik Ibn Shaman Brown was born on June 7, 1993, in Inglewood, California, to a single mother who worked on tanks in the United States Army. Lee was raised in Tupelo, Mississippi, and began to make music in high school with his brother Slim Jxmmi and local rapper Lil Pantz as "Dem Outta St8 Boyz". After graduating high school, Lee, alongside his brother, had a period of homelessness in which they squatted in an abandoned house.

Career 
In 2013, he and Slim Jxmmi signed to Mike Will Made It's label EarDrummers Entertainment as Rae Sremmurd. They have since released three studio albums under EarDrummers, SremmLife, SremmLife 2, and SR3MM.In March 2015, Lee was featured on Mike Will Made It's "Drinks on Us", which also featured artists Future and The Weeknd, and became his first single as solo artist. In September 2015, he was featured on Wiz Khalifa's "Burn Slow", which peaked at number 83 on the Billboard Hot 100, making it Lee's first solo entry on the chart.

In April 2017, Lee was featured on French Montana's "Unforgettable". The song peaked at number three on the Billboard Hot 100, making it Lee's first top ten single on the chart as a solo artist. In September 2018, Jhené Aiko featured Lee on her track "Sativa". Two months later, Lee released a song titled "TR666" alongside Trippie Redd. On May 4, 2018, almost two years after its initial announcement in August 2016, Lee released his debut solo album, Swaecation as a part of a triple album set, which also contained Rae Sremmurd's third studio album, SR3MM and Slim Jxmmi's debut studio album as a solo artist, Jxmtro. In October 2018, he featured on the song "Close to Me" by Ellie Goulding and Diplo. Lee also collaborated on XXXTentacion's song "Arms Around You" after his death, along with Lil Pump and Maluma. On October 18, 2018, Lee featured on Post Malone's song "Sunflower" for Spider-Man: Into the Spider-Verse, which became Malone's third and Lee's first song as a soloist to top the Billboard Hot 100. He appeared on Nicki Minaj's 2018 album Queen.

In May 2019, he collaborated on the song "Crave" with Madonna on her album Madame X. In August 2019, Lee released "Won't Be Late" featuring Canadian rapper Drake, produced by Tekno and Mike Will Made It. In October 2019, he was featured on 88rising's "Walking", alongside Joji, Jackson Wang, and Major Lazer.
As of 2020, he released the single "Someone Said", a reworked version of Travis Scott's "Sicko Mode". He also collaborated with Chloe x Halle on the Mike Will Made It-produced "Catch Up", from the former's album Ungodly Hour. He was featured on the remix to Arizona Zervas' hit song "Roxanne". On June 18, 2020, Lee released the single, "Reality Check".

Lee invested in esports organization XSET in October 2020. Lee has been working on his upcoming album Human Nature since 2020. In the same year, he appeared on Pop Smoke’s posthumous album Shoot for the Stars, Aim for the Moon. In 2021, he collaborated with Alicia Keys on the single "Lala" at the 2021 MTV Video Music Awards.

Artistry 
Lee has become known for his hooks and melodies, as demonstrated in collaborations with the likes of Madonna, Ellie Goulding, Anitta, French Montana, and Post Malone, among other artists. He has been described as 'the songbird of our generation', with several of his peers and critics praising his vocal ability. According to a 2017 interview with A Polaroid Story, Lee describes himself more as a singer than a rapper.

Personal life
Lee has a daughter, who was born in 2020, with Brazilian model Aline Martins. In 2022, he filed for joint custody.

Discography 

 Swaecation (2018)
 Human Nature (TBA)

Awards and nominations

Grammy Awards 
The Grammy Awards are annual awards presented by The Recording Academy to recognize outstanding achievement in the mainly English-language music industry.

!
|-
| 2017
|"Formation" (as songwriter)
| Song of the Year
| 
| style="text-align:center;"| 

|-
|  style="text-align:center;" rowspan="2"|2019
|rowspan="2"|"Sicko Mode" (with Travis Scott and Big Hawk)
| Best Rap Performance
| 
| style="text-align:center;" rowspan="2"| 

|-
| Best Rap Song
| 
|-
|  style="text-align:center;" rowspan="2"|2020
|rowspan="2"|"Sunflower" (with Post Malone)
| Record of the Year
| 
| style="text-align:center;" rowspan="2"| 

|-
| Best Pop Duo/Group Performance
| 
|-

MTVU Woodie Awards 
The MTVU Woodie Awards are semi-annual awards presented by MTVU which it states recognizes "the music voted best by college students".

!
|-
| 2017
| Swae Lee
| Songwriter of the Year
| 
| style="text-align:center;"|

Soul Train Music Awards 
The Soul Train Music Awards are annual awards to honor the best in Black music and entertainment.

!
|-
| 2016
| "Formation" (as songwriter)
| The Ashford & Simpson Songwriter's Award
| 
| style="text-align:center;"|

Teen Choice Awards 

!
|-
| 2019
| "Sunflower"
| Choice R&B/Hip-Hop Song
| 
| style="text-align:center;"|

References 

1993 births
Living people
21st-century American rappers
21st-century American male musicians
21st-century African-American male singers
African-American male rappers
Interscope Records artists
People from Tupelo, Mississippi
Rappers from Mississippi
Singer-songwriters from Mississippi
Southern hip hop musicians
American hip hop singers
People from Inglewood, California
Rappers from California
Singer-songwriters from California
African-American male singer-songwriters
Trap musicians
OnlyFans creators
Pop rappers